Hunterrr is a 2015 Indian Hindi-language adult comedy film written and directed by Harshavardhan Kulkarni. The film stars Gulshan Devaiah, Radhika Apte and Sai Tamhankar. The film revolves around an unassuming sex addict  and his lustful journey in life.

The film was released on 20 March 2015. The film was remade in Telugu as Babu Baga Busy (2017).

Plot
  
Mandar Ponkshe, is an atypical youth, a sex addict and a player. Even in his late 30s, he is only interested in 'scoring' one night stands while his friends are all married with kids. The story opens with one such scene where his friends tell him to get married as he is too old to screw around; in turn, Mandar explains his philosophy about sex as a purely physical act, somewhat akin to the satisfaction of the 'perfect' bowel movement. He asserts it "as a physical need", whereas to him "love is a different ball game and isn't necessary for sex".

The narration now moves back several years to Mandar's teenage. The year is 1989, whence Mandar along with his cousin Dilip (nicknamed Yusuf as a tribute to the thespian) visits his village in Maharashtra where their cousin Kshitij is already waiting for them. 15-year-old Kshitij is studying in a military school and is mature beyond his years in his views and aspects about marriage, love and sex. By the end of their vacation Mandar realises that he is no longer a kid. His life becomes more exotic as he starts to woo girls, watching adult films and fantasizing about ladies.

Later in the year 1995, Mandar is now grown up and is an engineering student in Pune. Dilip and Kshitij accompany him there too; the latter is an army officer by now. Mandar stalks Parul only for having sex with her. While making out in the hostel room, they are caught by the warden and Mandar gets expelled from the hostel, leading him to rent a small flat. There he meets a beautiful housewife Jyotsna and sets his sights on her. The dapper Kshitij, in the meanwhile, beds a steady parade of stunning girls at Mandar's flat. One of Kshitij's many girlfriends has a friend Anju who is being sexually abused by her own father. Greatly incensed on learning of this heinous act, Kshitij beats up the father and takes Anju and her kid brother away thus rescuing them. Kshitij falls in love with her and stops seeing other women. Amused, Mandar and Dilip talk about how Kshitij didn't fall for any of the pretty girls he was seeing, but fell in love with a dark complexioned plain girl. Kshitij marries Anju and they eventually have a son.

Getting back to Mandar's alliance with Jyotsana, their casual flirting gradually reaches a point where they start an affair. Hers is a marriage that has petered into nothingness, given her husband has let himself go out of shape and humour. Jyotsna needing sexual satisfaction finds it in Mandar. Their furtive affair carries on for a while, Jyotsana visiting Mandar's flat from time to time, before Deepak finds out. Once again, Mandar is forced to shift residences and finally ends up staying with Dilip. Later in 1996, Mandar meets Parul again in order to keep in touch with her and is left heartbroken when he finds her with another guy, Alok.

After college, Mandar is shown working a full-time job but is involved in a booty call arrangement with an older married woman who goes by the name Savita Bhabhi. After years of loveless one night stands, he takes Dilip's advise and decides to meet some girls through matrimonial sites. His strategy of being honest about his past affairs upsets most potential matches who are orthodox, conservative girls. When he finally meets one Tripti Gokhale, he is so smitten by her that he decides not be honest, but instead projects a holier-than-thou image. This almost backfires, as Tripti turns out to be a very open-minded girl who has no hang-ups about her own past and admits to having been in relationships before. Now stuck in a lie, Mandar has to continue projecting himself as an orthodox, colourless man. All the same, the two continue to meet and start liking each other.

Kshitij is killed during an encounter with insurgents in Kashmir. Mandar again is left heartbroken from losing his cousin and friend. This incident brings Tripti close to him as she comforts him. They eventually get engaged, but Mandar is having a tough time with the idea of monogamy. He has one last encounter with Savita Bhabhi. Worse still, while on an errand to pick up a distant relative from the airport, Mandar assumes that the person hasn't turned up and instead tries to pick up an attractive woman who turns out to be the distant relative. Embarrassed and shamed, Mandar barely gets out of the situation.

At this point, Tripti's ex-boyfriend Chaxx enters the equation. Cool, suave and charming, Chaxx is all that Mandar is not. That, and Tripti's history with Chaxx trouble him no end and make him insecure to the point where he assumes that Tripti is leaving him for Chaxx. Mandar decides to confess the truth about his sex obsession to Tripti and does so. Tripti also reveals that she got pregnant when she was with Chaxx and there was nothing between them as they have broken up. Tripti makes it clear to Mandar that Chaxx abandoned her when she needed him the most and therefore she can never take him back. She also tells him that Mandar is her present and she wants a future with him.

The film concludes with Mandar very happy as he is to marry the girl he loves as he narrates the mishaps between Tripti and himself to his cousin Dilip.

Cast
 Gulshan Devaiah as Mandar Ponkshe, a philanderer
 Radhika Apte as Tripti Gokhale
 Sai Tamhankar as Jyotsna Surve
 Sagar Deshmukh as Dilip "Yusuf" Ponkshe
 Veera Saxena as Parul Kotak
 Rachel D'Souza as Shobha N. T.
 Vaibbhav Tatwawdi as Kshitij
 Suraj Jagan as Chakravarthy "Chaxx"
 Sandeep Dhabale as Mandar's friend
 Neena Kulkarni as Mandar's mother
 Ravindra Mankani as Mandar's father
 Pratibha Date as Tripti's mother
 Dilip Vengurlekar as Tripti's father
 Nitesh Pandey as Deepak Surve, Jyotsna's husband
 Hansa Singh as Savitha Sahay
 Subhadip Raha as the policeman

Production
The entire filming was done in Mumbai, Pune and some rural parts of Maharashtra.

Music

The soundtrack of Hunterrr consists of seven songs composed by Khamosh Shah while the lyrics have been written by Vijay Maurya, Azazul Haque and Swanand Kirkire.

Reception

Critical response
On review aggregator website Rotten Tomatoes the movie has an approval score of 67% on the basis of 6 reviews with an average rating of 5.7 out of 10. Rajeev Masand didn't like the portrayal of women in the film saying that the movie shows them as "desperate-for-marriage becharis, or unhappy frustrated housewives. The sexist stereotyping is one thing; more offensive is the fact that the women in the film are uniformly dumb." Rajeev gave the film a rating of 2 out of 5 and said that, "Too bad the film itself is promising but ultimately disappointing. A film, that in the end, delivers little else but cheap laughs." Shubhra Gupta of The Indian Express gave the film a rating of 2 out of 5 saying that, "‘Hunterr’ could have been a genuinely ‘adult’ comedy of manners, but it stays right where it begins, the phrase ‘coming-of-age’ functioning more as eliciting an embarrassed titter than reaching the goal-post." Meena Iyer of The Times of India gave the film a rating of 3 out of 5 and said that, "Investing a bit more on real emotions of the lead characters, instead of fast-forwarding to their baser instincts constantly, would have made the film more relatable." Faiza S Khan of The Guardian gave the film a rating of 3 out of 5 and said that, "This sex comedy's lead is creepy and cringeworthy, but at least the film manages to take a small step away from the genre's usual crass misogyny".

Raja Sen of Rediff gave the film a rating of 2 out of 5 and said that, "Hunterrr is a deeply problematic film, and fails rather miserably". Sudhish Kamath of The Hindu found the writing of the film to be weak and said that, "In its current form, this Hunterrr is more horny than trigger-happy. He just walks around with a gun and rarely fires – except once in the whole film." Saibal Chatterjee of Financial Express said that, "The film tends to ramble aimlessly after it has made its pivotal point: the path of juvenile carnality has more thorns than roses. It goes round in concentric circles as the hero creates a web of problems for himself". Shubha Sherry Saha of Mid-Day gave the film a rating of 2.5 out of 5 and said that, "There is a subtle difference between a pure, unbridled take on the 'taboo' topic of sex and a tacky one that tries too hard. Unfortunately, though Harshavardhan Kulkarni's 'Hunterrr' shows a lot of promise, it veers more towards the latter." Sweta Kausal of Hindustan Times gave the film a rating of 2 out of 5 and said that, "Hunterrr is not great, but director Harshvardhan Kulkarni, who has also written the script, has managed to churn out an interesting film that might become a stepping stone in this genre for Hindi cinema."

See also
List of Hindi films of 2015

References

External links

2015 films
2010s Hindi-language films
2010s sex comedy films
Indian sex comedy films
Hindi films remade in other languages
2015 directorial debut films
2015 comedy films